HMS Prince Rupert was a First World War Royal Navy  named after Prince Rupert of the Rhine, an important Royalist commander of the English Civil War and key figure in the Restoration navy. Although she is the only ship of the Royal Navy to have ever had this precise name, other ships have been named after Prince Rupert as HMS Rupert. Her 12" main battery was stripped from the obsolete s.

The Lord Clive-class monitors were built in 1915 to engage German shore artillery in occupied Belgium during the First World War. Prince Rupert, with her sisters was regularly engaged in this service in the Dover Monitor Squadron, bombarding German positions along the coast and someway inland with their heavy guns.

Following the armistice in November 1918, Prince Rupert and all her sisters were put into reserve pending scrapping, as the reason for their existence had ended with the liberation of Belgium. In 1923 Prince Rupert was scrapped, outliving all her sister ships by two years as she had been briefly attached to the stone frigate  at Chatham Dockyard.

References

Bibliography
 
 
 
 

 

Lord Clive-class monitors
Ships built on the River Clyde
1915 ships
World War I monitors of the United Kingdom
Royal Navy ship names